Appetite is the debut album by singer/songwriter Kris Delmhorst, released in 1998.

Track listing 
All songs by Kris Delmhorst.
 "Sleeping Dogs" – 4:21
 "Weatherman" – 5:01
 "Arm's Length" – 4:09
 "Gravity" – 4:25
 "World Gives You Wings" – 4:23
 "North Dakota" – 4:00
 "Sink or Swim" – 4:55
 "Moscow Song" – 4:04
 "Red Herring" – 3:12
 "Open Road" – 4:24
 "Summer Breeze" – 4:10

Personnel
Kris Delmhorst - vocals, guitar, viola, cello, percussion
Billy Conway - percussion, drums
Sean Staples - guitar, mandolin, background vocals
Jabe "Charlie The Bubble Palantino" Beyer – harmonica, background vocals
Ry Cavanaugh – harmonica, ukulele, background vocals
Catie Curtis – guitar, background vocals
Jeff Kearns –  – guitar
Joseph Kessler – fiddle
Jennifer Kimball – guitar, background vocals
Patty Larkin – guitar, bouzouki
Michael Rivard – bass
Dave Rizzuti – pedal steel guitar
Alan Williams – organ

Production
 Produced, engineered and mixed by Alan Williams
 Mastered by Henk Kooistra
 Design by Jim Infantino
 Photography by Kris Delmhorst, Ivan Sigal, Thomas Hoebbel and Charan Devereaux

References

External links
 Official Kris Delmhorst website
 

1998 debut albums
Kris Delmhorst albums